Ağlama Bebeğim (tr: "Don't Cry My Child") is Ahmet Kaya's first album, released in 1985, but censored in Turkey shortly following the release. It features a number of Kaya's own poems, but also includes settings of poems by Ahmed Arif, Sabahattin Ali, Nazım Hikmet, and Mehmet Akif Ersoy.

Track listing 
"Ağlama Bebeğim" (Don't Cry My Child) 
 lyrics and music: Ahmet Kaya
"Kara Yazı" (Bad destiny)
 lyrics: Sabahattin Ali
 music: Ahmet Kaya
"Suskun" (Taciturn)
 lyrics: Ahmed Arif
 music: Ahmet Kaya
"Geçmiyor Günler" (The Days Aren't Passing)
 lyrics: Sabahattin Ali
 music: Ahmet Kaya
"Hasretinden Prangalar Eskittim"
 lyrics: Ahmed Arif
 music: Ahmet Kaya
"Kız Kaçıran" (Girl Snatcher)
 lyrics: Sabahattin Ali
 music: Ahmet Kaya
"Şahin Gibi" (Like a Falcon)
 lyrics: Karacaoğlan
 music: Ahmet Kaya
"Aynı Daldaydık" (We were on the Same Branch)
 lyrics: Nazım Hikmet
 music: Ahmet Kaya
"Maviye Çalar Gözlerin" (Your Eyes Are Tinged with Blue)
 lyrics: Ahmed Arif
 music: Ahmet Kaya
"Bırak Beni" (Leave Me)
 lyrics: A. Damar
 music: Ahmet Kaya
"Bizim Hikayemiz" (Our Story)
 lyrics and music: Ahmet Kaya
"Karanlıkta" (In the Darkness)
 lyrics and music: Ahmet Kaya
"Kurtuluş Savaşı Destanı" (Epic of the War of Liberation)
 lyrics and music: anonymous
"Uğurlar Ola" (Goodbye)
 lyrics: Mehmet Akif Ersoy
 music: Ahmet Kaya

References 

Ahmet Kaya albums
1985 debut albums